Marco Túlio de Paula Medeiros (born 31 May 1998), known as Marco Túlio, is a Brazilian professional footballer who plays as a left-back for Karviná.

Club career
Túlio started his career with Atlético Mineiro and after a spell with German side TuS Bövinghausen, he moved to the Czech Republic to first join Czech National Football League side Vlašim before joining Czech First League side Mladá Boleslav in January 2019. In February 2021, Túlio joined Ekstraklasa side Podbeskidzie on a deal until the end of the season. In August 2021, he returned to Czech football to join Karviná.

References

External links

Living people
1998 births
Footballers from Belo Horizonte
Brazilian footballers
Association football defenders
FC Sellier & Bellot Vlašim players
FK Mladá Boleslav players
Czech National Football League players
Czech First League players
Brazilian expatriate footballers
Brazilian expatriate sportspeople in Germany
Expatriate footballers in Germany
Expatriate footballers in the Czech Republic
Expatriate footballers in Poland
Brazilian expatriate sportspeople in the Czech Republic
Ekstraklasa players
Podbeskidzie Bielsko-Biała players
Brazilian expatriate sportspeople in Poland
MFK Karviná players